Bryan Stoltenberg (August 25, 1972 – January 4, 2013) was a professional American football player who played offensive lineman for the San Diego Chargers, New York Giants, and Carolina Panthers. He graduated from Clements High School of Sugar Land, Texas in 1991.

He died on January 4, 2013, in Sugar Land, Texas as a result of complications stemming from injuries sustained in a traffic collision the month prior.

References

External links

1972 births
2013 deaths
Road incident deaths in Texas
American football offensive linemen
San Diego Chargers players
New York Giants players
Carolina Panthers players
Colorado Buffaloes football players
People from Kearney, Nebraska
All-American college football players
Players of American football from Nebraska